Griffin Alexander Canning (born May 11, 1996) is an American professional baseball pitcher for the Los Angeles Angels of Major League Baseball (MLB). He played college baseball at the University of California, Los Angeles (UCLA). He made his MLB debut in 2019.

Amateur career
Canning attended Santa Margarita Catholic High School in Rancho Santa Margarita, California. He played for the school's baseball team as a pitcher. As a senior, he had an 11–3 win–loss record with a 1.51 earned run average (ERA) and 123 strikeouts, and was named the Orange County Register Pitcher of the Year. In his final game, he led Santa Margarita to victory in the 2014 California Interscholastic Federation SS Division I Championship, recording 11 strikeouts and allowing only two hits. Canning was drafted by the Colorado Rockies in the 38th round of the 2015 Major League Baseball Draft, but did not sign and played college baseball at University of California, Los Angeles (UCLA) for the Bruins.

Canning made 15 appearances with 11 starts as a freshman at UCLA in 2015. He was 7–1 with a 2.97 ERA and 66 strikeouts. As a sophomore, he became UCLA's number one starter. He made 15 starts, going 5–8 with a 3.70 ERA and 95 strikeouts. Canning returned as UCLA's ace in 2017. In 17 starts, he went 7–4 with a 2.34 ERA and 140 strikeouts.

Professional career
The Los Angeles Angels selected Canning with the 47th pick in the second round of the 2017 MLB draft. He signed with the Angels for a $1,459,200 signing bonus, but did not pitch in 2017. He made his professional debut in 2018 with the Inland Empire 66ers of the Class A-Advanced California League, and after pitching 8.2 scoreless innings, he was promoted to the Mobile BayBears of the Class AA Southern League. He was promoted to the Salt Lake Bees of the Class AAA Pacific Coast League in June. In 25 starts between the three teams, Canning went 4–3 with a 3.65 ERA and a 1.26 WHIP. Canning returned to Salt Lake to begin the 2019 season up until his major league promotion.

Los Angeles Angels
On April 30, 2019, the Angels promoted Canning to the major leagues and he made his debut that night, against the Toronto Blue Jays, recording six strikeouts over  innings pitched. After multiple trips to the IL with elbow inflammation, the Angels announced on August 22, 2019, that they would shut down Canning for the rest of the season, cutting his rookie season short. He went 5–6 with a 4.58 ERA and 96 strikeouts. 

In 2020, Canning went 2–3 with a 3.99 ERA and 56 strikeouts in 11 starts. He was tied for the AL lead among pitchers with three defensive runs saved and made just one error out of 16 chances. Canning went on to win his first Gold Glove Award that season.

In 2021, Canning went 5–4 with a 5.60 ERA and 62 strikeouts in 13 starts. On July 3, 2021, Canning was optioned to Triple-A Salt Lake. On August 10, 2021, the Angels announced that Canning would miss the rest of the season with a low back stress fracture.

Canning was placed on the 60-day injured list to begin the 2022 season. In August, he was shut down after experiencing multiple setbacks in his recovery, and did not make a professional appearance on the year.

On January 13, 2023, Canning signed a one-year, $850K contract with the Angels, avoiding salary arbitration.

Personal
Canning grew up an Angels fan.

References

External links

UCLA Bruins bio

1996 births
Living people
Sportspeople from Mission Viejo, California
Baseball players from California
Major League Baseball pitchers
Los Angeles Angels players
Gold Glove Award winners
UCLA Bruins baseball players
Inland Empire 66ers of San Bernardino players
Mobile BayBears players
Salt Lake Bees players